The Mennonite Brethren Collegiate Institute (MBCI) is a private middle and high school with approximately 415 students from Grade 5 to Grade 12.

MBCI's men's and women's volleyball teams have won provincial championships. The band has also won the Optimist Festival's Chairman's Award.

Though MBCI is an inclusive school and has students from many backgrounds, MBCI's culture is most informed by the Mennonite Brethren religious community—a strand of Protestant Anabaptism noted for its adherence to pacifism.

Notable alumni 
Jon Buller, Contemporary Christian musician, founder of Hear the Music Ministries
Brendan Fehr, Actor
Cindy Klassen, Olympic medallist in speed skating
Starfield, a Christian music group

References

External links
 
Mennonite Brethren Collegiate Institute (Winnipeg, Manitoba, Canada) at Global Anabaptist Mennonite Encyclopedia Online

Mennonite schools in Manitoba
Private schools in Manitoba
Educational institutions established in 1945
Middle schools in Winnipeg
High schools in Winnipeg
Mennonite schools in Canada
1945 establishments in Manitoba